Malinovo is a rural locality (a village) in Kupriyanovskoye Rural Settlement, Gorokhovetsky District, Vladimir Oblast, Russia. The population was 10 as of 2010.

Geography 
Malinovo is located 10 km south of Gorokhovets (the district's administrative centre) by road. Khoroshevo is the nearest rural locality.

References 

Rural localities in Gorokhovetsky District